In mathematics, the Segal–Bargmann space (for Irving Segal and Valentine Bargmann), also known as the Bargmann space or Bargmann–Fock space, is the space of holomorphic functions F in n complex variables satisfying the square-integrability condition:

where here dz denotes the 2n-dimensional Lebesgue measure on  It is a Hilbert space with respect to the associated inner product:

Properties 

A basic property of this space is that pointwise evaluation is continuous, meaning that for each  there is a constant C such that

It then follows from the Riesz representation theorem that there exists a unique Fa in the Segal–Bargmann space such that

The function Fa may be computed explicitly as

where, explicitly,

The function Fa is called the coherent state (applied in mathematical physics) with parameter a, and the function

is known as the reproducing kernel for the Segal–Bargmann space. Note that

 

meaning that integration against the reproducing kernel simply gives back (i.e., reproduces) the function F, provided, of course that F is an element of the space (and in particular is holomorphic).

Note that

It follows from the Cauchy–Schwarz inequality that elements of the Segal–Bargmann space satisfy the pointwise bounds

Quantum mechanical interpretation 

One may interpret a unit vector in the Segal–Bargmann space as the wave function for a quantum particle moving in  In this view,  plays the role of the classical phase space, whereas  is the configuration space. The restriction that F be holomorphic is essential to this interpretation; if F were an arbitrary square-integrable function, it could be localized into an arbitrarily small region of the phase space, which would go against the uncertainty principle. Since, however, F is required to be holomorphic, it satisfies the pointwise bounds described above, which provides a limit on how concentrated F can be in any region of phase space.

Given a unit vector F in the Segal–Bargmann space, the quantity

may be interpreted as a sort of phase space probability density for the particle. Since the above quantity is manifestly non-negative, it cannot coincide with the Wigner function of the particle, which usually has some negative values. In fact, the above density coincides with the Husimi function of the particle, which is obtained from the Wigner function by smearing with a Gaussian. This connection will be made more precise below, after we introduce the Segal–Bargmann transform.

The canonical commutation relations 

One may introduce annihilation operators  and creation operators  on the Segal–Bargmann space by setting

and

Indeed, Bargmann was led to introduce the particular form of the inner product on the Segal–Bargmann space precisely so that the creation and annihilation operators would be adjoints of each other.

We may now construct self-adjoint "position" and "momentum" operators Aj and Bj by the formulas:

 
 

The Segal–Bargmann transform 

Thus, there is a unitary map  from the position Hilbert space  to the Segal–Bargmann space that intertwines these operators with the usual position and momentum operators.

The map  may be computed explicitly as a modified double Weierstrass transform,

We may now be more precise about the connection between the Segal–Bargmann space and the Husimi function of a particle.

This fact is easily verified by using the formula for  along with the standard formula for the Husimi function in terms of coherent states.

Since  is unitary, its Hermitian adjoint is its inverse.

Since, however,  is a holomorphic function, there can be many integrals involving   that give the same value. (Think of the Cauchy integral formula.) Thus, there can be many different inversion formulas for the Segal–Bargmann transform .

Another useful inversion formula is

where

This inversion formula may be understood as saying that the position "wave function"  may be obtained from the phase-space "wave function"   by integrating out the momentum variables. This  is to be contrasted to  the Wigner function, where the position probability density is obtained from the phase space (quasi-)probability density by integrating out the momentum variables.

Generalizations 

There are various generalizations of the Segal–Bargmann space and transform. In one of these, the role of the configuration space  is played by the group manifold of a compact Lie group, such as SU(N). The various Gaussians appearing in the ordinary Segal–Bargmann space and transform are replaced by heat kernels. This generalized Segal–Bargmann transform could be applied, for example, to the rotational degrees of freedom of a rigid body, where the configuration space is the compact Lie groups SO(3).

This generalized Segal–Bargmann transform gives rise to a system of coherent states, known as heat kernel coherent states. These have been used widely in the literature on loop quantum gravity.

See also
 Theta representation
 Hardy space

References

Sources

 
 
 
 
 
 

Function spaces